Peter Brian Heenan (born 1961) is a New Zealand botanist.

Heenan graduated from the University of Canterbury with a PhD in 2000.

Names published 
(incomplete list - 193 names published)
Alternanthera nahui Heenan & de Lange, New Zealand J. Bot. 47(1): 102 (99-104; figs. 2B, 3C, 4B) (2009).
Arthropodium bifurcatum Heenan, A.D.Mitch. & de Lange, New Zealand J. Bot. 42(2): 239 (-242; fig. 7) (2004).
Brachyscome lucens Molloy & Heenan, Phytotaxa 415(1): 35 (2019).
(These may not all be accepted names.)

See also Taxa named by Peter Brian Heenan.

Selected publications

References

External links 

 

21st-century New Zealand botanists
Living people
1961 births
University of Canterbury alumni